The Rose is a South Korean indie-rock band under their company Windfall and partnered up with Transparent Arts. The band is composed of four members: Kim Woo-sung (vocals, guitar), Park Do-joon (keyboard), Lee Ha-joon (drums), and Lee Jae-hyeong (bass). Prior to its debut with J&Star, the band had long been a popular indie group before making its official mainstream release with "Sorry" on August 3, 2017.

History

2015–2016: Early formation and busking days 
Dojoon and Jaehyeong met as the two were busking in Hongdae. Often busy as a DSP Media trainee, Dojoon rarely had the time to meet with Jaehyeong and later confessed on a radio interview that he was not the type to disobey his management company. Jaehyeong started busking with Hajoon later in the year after the two met while practicing in the same studio, and the duo set out in search of another member.

By the end of 2015, Jaehyeong recruited Dojoon, who had left his company and returned to busking. The trio started the indie band Windfall and began to write their own music, while posting musical covers on YouTube and performing in the streets. When the band decided to search for their fourth and final member, Dojoon worked to recruit Woosung, who he had met through a mutual friend.

In 2016, the band entered J&Star Company.

2017–2018: Mainstream debut, Paint it Rose Tour, Void and Dawn 

On August 3, 2017, the band debuted its mainstream single, "Sorry", penned by Hajoon and under a new name, The Rose. Later that month, the Rolling Stone India lauded The Rose's single for being "a fantastic introduction to the band's soft-rock vibe" and described "Woosung's immense control over his raspy vocals... particularly impressive." The group then made a subsequent comeback on October 31 with its second single, "Like We Used To."

On December 14, Billboard named The Rose's "Sorry" as one of the best Korean pop songs of 2017. By this time, the music video had garnered over 3 million views on YouTube, a startling number for an amateur group. Later that month, the band announced its first European tour titled Paint It Rose, they performed in Brussels, Moscow, Istanbul, London and Budapest throughout the month of February 2018. Woosung later announced during a radio interview with Arirang K-Show that the tour had sold out.

On December 24, the band hosted its first solo concert The Black Rose Day at the Mpot Hall in Seoul. The group performed its two existing singles, covers of English songs, and unreleased songs from the group's busking days titled "Photographer" and "Beautiful Girl."

On January 5, 2018, The Rose performed at the Rolling Hall 23rd Anniversary Concert, alongside other established indie artists such as Cheeze, O.WHEN, and Fromm. The band showcased three new unreleased songs, titled "Baby," "OMG," and "ILY."

On January 12, the band was listed as one of the top 5 Korean breakout artists to watch in 2018 by Billboard. The article wrote that it is "rare for rock-leaning bands to make a major K-pop impression upon debut, but The Rose's gorgeously emotive "Sorry" was able to do that, scoring a spot on Billboard's year-end critics' song list and confirming themselves a multifaceted, new talent on the scene."

On January 24, Soompi announced The Rose as one of the nominees for Rookie of the Year for its 13th Annual Soompi Awards.

On March 17, the band headlined the closing ceremony concert of the 29th Korean American Students Conference, hosted by Northwestern University in Chicago.

On April 16, The Rose released their first mini-album entitled Void. During their American tour, the group sat with Billboard to talk about their latest release: "through the five-track effort, The Rose's intent was to highlight the darker elements of human emotion through dynamic pop-rock."

On August 14, The Rose was featured on the Tofu Personified  original soundtrack. "With You"  was written, composed and arranged by Jaehyeong, with vocals performed by Woosung.

On October 4, they released their second mini-album entitled Dawn.

2019–2021: Red, We Rose You Live Tour, lawsuit and military service
From May 17–19, 2019, The Rose performed for the first time at KCON Japan at Makuhari Messe in Chiba. On August 13, the band released their third single album Red. They subsequently embarked on their second world tour, We Rose You Live Tour, on August 17. On August 31, the band released the song "Strangers"  for the Hell Is Other People soundtrack. In 2019, the band participated in the survival talent show Superband.

On January 15, 2020, it was announced that The Rose would the opening act of Halsey's Manic World Tour in Seoul on May 9. However, the tour was pushed back to summer 2021 due to the COVID-19 pandemic.

On February 28, The Rose reportedly filed a lawsuit against J&Star Company to terminate their exclusive contract. In their suit, the band alleged that the agency failed to provide any payment since their debut and that it demanded a rigorous promotional schedule. The Rose cited J&Star's pledge to provide them with monthly revenue reports which never materialized, as well as the company's unilateral decision to plan a 17-city American tour spanning 32 days, which would have required a concert every other day. J&Star Company denied the accusations and plan to "take all necessary legal measures".

On March 4, J&Star Company released a secondary statement that refuted The Rose's claims and accusations against the company, saying the group was being deceptive, and broke integrity and dignity. The label stressed their intent to take counter legal actions for violation of contract, defamation of character, and more.

On July 6, Dojoon enlisted for his mandatory military service. On August 3, which marked the band's third anniversary since debut, active members Woosung, Hajoon, and Jaehyeong revealed that they had created new social media accounts for the band and released the following statement in both Korean and English:

On August 24, they released the single "Black Rose," named after and dedicated to their fans.

Members Hajoon and Jaehyeong enlisted for their military service on October 12, 2020, and November 9, 2020, respectively.

Following the release of his solo single "Lazy," Woosung revealed in an interview with South China Morning Post in June 2021 that The Rose has settled their lawsuit with J&Star and had been released from their contract, saying, “Everything's been figured out...We’re not under contract with anyone any more. The [other] members are in the army and we’re waiting for them to come out. That's all I can say.” He also stated that the band plans to remain together.

After the lawsuit was settled, it was announced that they will release the single "Beauty and the Beast" on December 29, 2021.

2022–present: Return and new label 
Following the discharge of Dojoon, Hajoon, and Jaehyeong, and the release of Woosung's solo album Moth, Woosung confirmed their self-made label Windfall. In August 2022, the band signed with Far East Movement's Transparent Arts as their new label, with Transparent and Wasserman Music representing the band. On the 7th of October, they released the title track 'sour' of the album Heal. Additionally, in support of Heal, they announced their world tour, Heal Together World Tour, with dates in North America, South America, Europe, and Asia from 2022 until 2023.

Members
 Woosung (우성) – leader, lead vocals, electric guitar
 Dojoon (도준) – main vocals, keyboards, acoustic guitar
 Hajoon (하준) – drums, sub-vocals
 Jaehyeong (재형) – bass, sub-vocals

Discography

Studio albums

Single albums

Extended plays

Singles

Tours and concerts 
Headlining concerts in Seoul
 The Black Rose Day (2017)
 The Rose Day: Long Drive (2018)
 Home Coming (2018)

Headlining tours
 Paint it Rose Tour in Europe (2018)
 Paint it Rose Tour in USA (2018)
 Paint it Rose Tour in Mexico/South America (2018)
 Paint it Rose Tour in Europe/Australia: 2nd Coloring (2018)
 We Rose You Live Tour (2019)
 Heal Together World Tour (2022)

Filmography

Videography

Music videos

Awards and nominations

References

External links

 

Musical groups established in 2017
K-pop music groups
Musical groups from Seoul
Musical quartets
2017 establishments in South Korea
South Korean pop rock music groups